John Quincey Harris (1815 – 3 August 1846) was a British Whig politician.

Harris was elected a Whig Member of Parliament for Newcastle-under-Lyme at the 1841 general election but was unseated via election petition on 11 May 1842 due to bribery by his agent. While he stood again at the resulting by-election, and topped the poll, he was again unseated by election petition due to bribery, and his Conservative rival John Campbell Colquhoun was declared elected in his place.

References

External links
 

UK MPs 1841–1847
Whig (British political party) MPs for English constituencies
1815 births
1846 deaths
Members of the Parliament of the United Kingdom for Newcastle-under-Lyme